

Historical and architectural interest bridges

Major road bridges

List of bridges by length 
The top ten longest bridges in Turkey by total span.

See also 

 Transport in Turkey
 Rail transport in Turkey
 List of highways in Turkey
 List of Roman bridges
 List of aqueducts in the Roman Empire
 Geography of Turkey
 Türkiye'deki tarihi köprüler  - Historic bridges in Turkey

Notes and references

Notes

Other references

Further reading

External links 
 
 
 
 
 
 

 
Turkey
Lists of buildings and structures in Turkey
Bridges